Didelphis is a genus of New World marsupials. The six species in the genus Didelphis, commonly known as Large American opossums, are members of the opossum order, Didelphimorphia.

The genus Didelphis is composed of cat-sized omnivorous species, which can be recognized by their prehensile tails and their tendency to feign death when cornered. The largest species, the Virginia opossum (Didelphis virginiana), is the only marsupial to be found in North America north of Mexico. The Virginia opossum has opposable toes on their two back feet.

Phylogeny
Cladogram of living large American opossums, the genus Didelphis:

Species

References

External links

Opossums
Marsupial genera
Taxa named by Carl Linnaeus